S. Klein On The Square, or simply S. Klein, was a popular-priced department store chain based in New York City. The flagship stores (a main building and a women's fashion building) were located along Union Square East in Manhattan; this location would combine with the 1920s idiomatic catch phrase "on the square" (meaning "honest and straight-up") to provide the subtitle. S. Klein positioned itself as a step above regional discount stores of its time (Two Guys, Great Eastern Mills), more fashion aware than E. J. Korvette, and a more affordable option compared to traditional department stores like Macy's, or Abraham & Straus. S. Klein stores were full-line department stores, including furniture departments, fur salons, and full-service pet departments.

Russian-born Samuel Klein (1886–1942) founded S. Klein in 1905, or around 1912, on the block of Union Square East, between 14th and 15th Streets (in the former Union Square Hotel).

Suburban growth
S. Klein started to build new suburban stores in the 1960s but in an unusual way. Instead of being an anchor store in the regional malls being built at the time, S. Klein would often build as an outparcel near, but not connected to the mall itself.  Most stores were located in New York and New Jersey in the greater New York City area.  S. Klein operated stores as far south as Alexandria, Virginia, and at Beltway Plaza in Greenbelt, Maryland. S. Klein also had a presence in the Philadelphia and suburban market, with stores at Roosevelt Blvd, Marple-Springfield and Cherry Hill.  The Glenolden store was added after acquiring the former Topp's building.

Gradual decline
By the mid-1970s the parent company of S. Klein, Meshulam Riklis' Rapid-American Corp. (also owner of the McCrory Stores dime-store chain), seemed more interested in the real estate the company held than the retail operations (a fate Two Guys would fall to in 1982), and it started to close the stores in clusters. By 1978 the last of the chain's stores would close. The flagship store in Manthattan's Union Square is now the site of the Zeckendorf Towers apartment complex.

Traces of S. Klein today
The annex building, between 15th and 16th Streets, pictured in the 1936 photo above, remains as of 2022.

A significant part of the signage was still in place at Klein's former location in downtown Newark, New Jersey, until its demolition.  This location had been vacant since the store was closed in 1976, and the neon sign (in 2008 photo) that proclaims, "S Klein, On The Square" complete with their neon carpenter's square logo was still intact as of 2012. In late 2012 the Newark planning board approved a proposal by the Prudential Insurance Company to build a new 20 story office building on the site of the S. Klein building, and several other long abandoned buildings. The S. Klein building was demolished in late July 2013.

The last known existing signage with the company name (as of 2013) is in a tile inlay in the entrance flooring of a former store location at 68 Clinton Street, New York City. The entrance now leads to Pig and Khao, a Filipino restaurant.

In popular culture
In the  song "Marry The Man" from the musical Guys and Dolls, the lyrics mention three department stores: "At Wanamaker's and Saks and Klein's". In the song "Drop That Name" from the musical Bells Are Ringing, Judy Holliday's character surprises the high society crowd when she mentions Klein's and says, "I do all my shopping there."

Klein’s is mentioned in Season 2, Episode 7 of Mad Men. Klein's is also mentioned in the dystopian novel Make Room! Make Room!, as one of their food sales starts a riot.

References

External links
Images of downtown Newark store
1946 Sale to Grayson Shops [of California] describes company history and operation
Article from nj.com

Defunct department stores based in New York City
Gramercy Park
Companies disestablished in 1976
1976 disestablishments in New York (state)
Union Square, Manhattan